Zorjin (also Romanized as Zorjīn, Zorojīn, and Zārjīn; also known as Zarchīn, Zowrjīn, and Zūrjīn) is a village in Bazarjan Rural District, in the Central District of Tafresh County, Markazi Province, Iran. At the 2006 census, its population was 231, in 83 families.

References 

Populated places in Tafresh County